Shyamal Bose (born 8 August 1963) is an Indian film director, actor and screenwriter in Bengali Cinema or Tollywood. He is also the co-founder of the theatre group Baghbazar Natya Kendra, situated in Kolkata. He is known for his films Antim Yatra (2015), Bastav (2016) & Asamay (2017).

Career
He started his career with acting in theatres in Kolkata at the age of 20. His first film as writer-director is Notun Surjo released in the year 2010, he also acted in the same movie and then he continued to writing & directing films like Neel Swapna, Nayan Tara, Alor Khonje and others.

Filmography

General reference
"Young, independent filmmakers need to be encouraged: Soumitra", The Times of India City, 21 September 2016

"Soumitra Chatterjee started shooting for 'Samay' with director Shyamal Bose", Etv Bharat, 8 July 2020

External links

Film directors from Kolkata
1963 births
Living people